The Importation Act 1463 (3 Edw. 4, c. 2) was an Act of the Parliament of England passed during the reign of Edward IV.

Merchants of the Hanseatic League resident in England were importing a large amount of corn. Parliament therefore passed the Importation Act to prohibit the importation of corn when the price of wheat at the port at which it was purchased did not exceed 6s. 8d. per quarter. This was done to relieve the condition of labourers and to raise the price of English-grown corn.

Notes

Acts of the Parliament of England
1463 in England
Protectionism
1460s in law